Sam F.S. Chin (Chin Fan Siong, 曾帆祥, born August 1, 1954) is the Grandmaster and Gatekeeper of the martial art called I Liq Chuan, and also known as "the Martial Art of Awareness". Chin developed the grading system for this system.

Martial arts career 
Chin was trained since childhood by his father, Chin Lik Keong, founder of I Liq Chuan, and in 1978, he won the state heavy weight kickboxing championships of Selangor (Malaysia). 
In August 2009  Chin was officially named the Gate Keeper and Lineage Holder of the I Liq Chuan.  He is also the founder and President of Chin Family I Liq Chuan Association that supports the martial art's growth.

Chin has taught workshops worldwide , written two books on his family's martial art, co-authored articles, and produced a series of DVDs. 
Chin was interviewed by Jess O'Brien for his 2007 book "Nei Jia Quan: Internal Martial Arts".

In August 2009, Chin was also recognized by the USA Wushu Kung-Fu Federation as a Hall of Fame Outstanding Master. In 2014, he was written about by Ashe Higgs in Kung Fu Tai Chi Magazine "Finding the Center: I Liq Chuan’s Three Essential Qualities for Offense and Defense as One".  Chin  was also the subject of the 2016 CCTV Documentary "Kung Fu Abroad: I Liq Chuan 中央电视台《功夫在外》纪录片". 

On November 15, 2017 Sam Chin became an honorary professor at the University of Plovdiv, Bulgaria in recognition of his lifetime of achievement in spreading I Liq Chuan.

Publications

Books 

 I Liq Chuan: Martial Art of Awareness  
 Zhong Xin Dao I Liq Chuan System Guide Booklet.

Magazine Articles 

 The Matrix of I Liq Chuan in March/April 2005 issue of Kung Fu Tai Chi Magazine.

Training Videos 

 Introduction to 15 Basic Exercises – 2 DVDs
 Grading Criteria for Instructors – 15 Basic Exercises – 3 DVDs
 Tai Chi Point Training – Introducing Fa-Jing Workshop – DVD
 I Liq Chuan Butterfly Form – Sequence (English with Russian Translation) Instructional – DVD
 I Liq Chuan Butterfly Form – Application & Fajing (English with Russian Translation) Instructional – DVD
 Five Elements In I Liq Chuan – DVD
 Spinning Hands Process – DVD
 Sticky & Spinning Hands – Upper Hands Process – DVD
 Sticky Hands – Introduction to Lower Hand Process – DVD
 San Da Vol. 1 – Introduction to San Shou – DVD
 San Da Vol. 2 – DVD
 San Da Vol. 3 – Applications of 5 Elements – DVD
 San Da Vol. 4 – Throwing Hands – DVD
 San Da Vol. 5 – Timing And Spacing – DVD
 San Da vol. 6 – Kicking – DVD
 I Liq Chuan Chin-Na: A Flowing Process – 2 DVDs
 Introduction to Phoenix Eye Workshop – DVD
 Structure And Energy – DVD
 Introduction to Nei Gong & Engagement Qualities (w/Russian Translation) – 3 DVDs
 Knowing The Moment – Point of Contact – DVD
 Meet And Match – DVD
 Chi Kung for Health – DVD

References

1954 births
Living people
Martial arts school founders
Martial arts trainers